This is a list of naval guns of all countries ordered by caliber.

See also 
List of artillery
List of the largest cannon by caliber
Glossary of British ordnance terms

References

External links 
NAVWEAPS - Naval weapons of the world, 1880 to today (retrieved 2010-02-01)

 
Naval